Stephen Durden is an electrical engineer at the Jet Propulsion Laboratory in Pasadena, California. He was named a Fellow of the Institute of Electrical and Electronics Engineers (IEEE) in 2012 for his contributions to microwave remote sensing and radar systems, including spaceborne cloud radar.

References 

Fellow Members of the IEEE
Living people
Year of birth missing (living people)
American electrical engineers